Arlington County is a county in the U.S. state of Virginia. The county is located in Northern Virginia on the southwestern bank of the Potomac River directly across from Washington, D.C.. The county is coextensive with the U.S. Census Bureau's census-designated place of Arlington. Arlington County is the second-largest city in the Washington metropolitan area, although it does not have the legal designation of an independent city or incorporated town under Virginia state law.

In 2020, the county's population was estimated at 238,643, making Arlington County the sixth-largest county in Virginia by population and the largest unincorporated community in the United States. If Arlington County were incorporated as a city, it would be the third-most populous city in Virginia. It has the fifth-highest income per capita among all U.S. counties, and is the nation's 11th-most densely populated county.

 
Arlington is home to the Pentagon (headquarters of the U.S. Department of Defense), the Defense Advanced Research Projects Agency (DARPA), Reagan National Airport, and Arlington National Cemetery. In academia, the county contains Marymount University, the satellite campuses and research programs of George Mason University's Antonin Scalia Law School, Schar School of Policy and Government, and the Jimmy and Rosalynn Carter School for Peace and Conflict Resolution, as well as graduate programs, research, and non-traditional student education centers at the University of Virginia and Virginia Tech. Arlington is also the future home of the co-headquarters of Amazon, and the global headquarters of aerospace manufacturing and defense industry giants Boeing and Raytheon Technologies, as well as the American subsidiary of BAE Systems.

History

Colonial Virginia
The area that now constitutes Arlington County had been part of Fairfax County in the Colony of Virginia. Land grants from the British monarch were awarded to prominent Englishmen in exchange for political favors and efforts at development. One of the grantees was Thomas Fairfax for whom both Fairfax County and the City of Fairfax are named. The county's name of Arlington comes from  Henry Bennet, Earl of Arlington, a plantation along the Potomac River, and Arlington House, the family residence on that property. George Washington Parke Custis, grandson of First Lady Martha Washington, acquired this land in 1802. The estate was eventually passed down to Mary Anna Custis Lee, wife of General Robert E. Lee. The property later became Arlington National Cemetery during the Civil War.

District of Columbia

The area that now includes almost all of Arlington County, along with most of what is present-day Alexandria, was ceded to the new federal government by Virginia. With the passage of the Residence Act in 1790, Congress approved a new permanent capital to be located on the Potomac River, the exact area to be selected by U.S. President George Washington. The Residence Act originally only allowed the President to select a location in Maryland as far east as what is now the Anacostia River. However, President George Washington shifted the federal territory's borders to the southeast in order to include the existing town of Alexandria at the district's southern tip.

In 1791, Congress, at Washington's request, amended the Residence Act to approve the new site, including the territory ceded by Virginia. However, this amendment to the Residence Act specifically prohibited the "erection of the public buildings otherwise than on the Maryland side of the River Potomac."

During 1791–92, Andrew Ellicott and several assistants placed boundary stones at every mile point. Fourteen of these markers were in Virginia and many of the stones are still standing.

When Congress arrived in the new capital, they passed the Organic Act of 1801 to officially organize the District of Columbia and placed the entire federal territory, including the cities of Washington, Georgetown, and Alexandria, under the exclusive control of Congress. Further, the territory within the District was organized into two counties: the County of Washington to the east of the Potomac and the County of Alexandria to the west. It included almost all of the present Arlington County, plus part of what is now the independent city of Alexandria. This Act formally established the borders of the area that would eventually become Arlington but the citizens located in the District were no longer considered residents of Maryland or Virginia, thus ending their representation in Congress.

Retrocession

Residents of Alexandria County had expected the federal capital's location to result in higher land prices and the growth of commerce. Instead the county found itself struggling to compete with the Chesapeake and Ohio Canal at the port of Georgetown, which was farther inland and on the northern side of the Potomac River next to the city of Washington. Members of Congress from other areas of Virginia also used their power to prohibit funding for projects, such as the Alexandria Canal, which would have increased competition with their home districts. In addition, Congress had prohibited the federal government from establishing any offices in Alexandria, which made the county less important to the functioning of the national government.

Alexandria had also been an important center of the slave trade; Franklin and Armfield Office in Alexandria was once an office used in slave trading. Rumors circulated that abolitionists in Congress were attempting to end slavery in the District; such an action would have further depressed Alexandria's slavery-based economy. At the same time, an active abolitionist movement arose in Virginia that created a division on the question of slavery in the Virginia General Assembly. Pro-slavery Virginians recognized that if Alexandria were returned to Virginia, it could provide two new representatives who favored slavery in the state legislature. (Some time after retrocession, during the American Civil War, this division led to the formation of the state of West Virginia, which comprised by what was then 51 counties in the northwest that favored abolitionism.)

Largely as a result of the economic neglect by Congress, divisions over slavery, and the lack of voting rights for the residents of the District, a movement grew to return Alexandria to Virginia from the District of Columbia. From 1840 to 1846, Alexandrians petitioned Congress and the Virginia legislature to approve this transfer known as retrocession. On February 3, 1846, the Virginia General Assembly agreed to accept the retrocession of Alexandria if Congress approved. Following additional lobbying by Alexandrians, Congress passed legislation on July 9, 1846, to return all the District's territory south of the Potomac River back to Virginia, pursuant to a referendum; President James K. Polk signed the legislation the next day. A referendum on retrocession was held on September 1–2, 1846. The voters in the City of Alexandria voted in favor of the retrocession, 734 to 116, while those in the rest of Alexandria County voted against retrocession 106 to 29. Pursuant to the referendum, President Polk issued a proclamation of transfer on September 7, 1846. However, the Virginia legislature did not immediately accept the retrocession offer. Virginia legislators were concerned that the people of Alexandria County had not been properly included in the retrocession proceedings. After months of debate, the Virginia General Assembly voted to formally accept the retrocession legislation on March 13, 1847.

In 1852, the Virginia legislature voted to incorporate a portion of Alexandria County to make the City of Alexandria, which until then had been administered only as an unincorporated town within the political boundaries of Alexandria County.

Civil War

During the American Civil War, Virginia seceded from the Union as a result of a statewide referendum held on May 23, 1861; the voters from Alexandria County approved secession by a vote of 958–48. This vote indicates the degree to which its only town, Alexandria, was pro-secession and pro-Confederate. The rural county residents outside the city were Union loyalists and voted against secession.

Although Virginia was part of the Confederacy, the Confederacy did not control all of Northern Virginia. In 1862, the U.S. Congress passed a law that some claimed had required that owners of property in those districts in which the insurrection existed were to pay their real estate taxes in person.

In 1864, during the war, the federal government confiscated the Abingdon estate, which was located on and near the present Ronald Reagan Washington National Airport, when its owner failed to pay the estate's property tax in person because he was serving in the Confederate Army. The government then sold the property at auction, whereupon the purchaser leased the property to a third party.

After the war ended in 1865, the Abingdon estate's heir, Alexander Hunter, started a legal action to recover the property. James A. Garfield, a Republican member of the U.S. House of Representatives who had been a brigadier general in the Union Army during the Civil War and who later became the 20th President of the United States, was an attorney on Hunter's legal team. In 1870, the Supreme Court of the United States, in a precedential ruling, found that the government had illegally confiscated the property and ordered that it be returned to Hunter.

The property containing the home of Confederate General Robert E. Lee's family at and around Arlington House was subjected to an appraisal of $26,810, on which a tax of $92.07 was assessed. However, Lee's wife, Mary Anna Custis Lee, the owner of the property, did not pay this tax in person. As a result of the 1862 law, the Federal government confiscated the property and made it into a military cemetery.

After the war ended and after the death of his parents, George Washington Custis Lee, the Lees' eldest son, initiated a legal action in an attempt to recover the property. In December 1882, the U.S. Supreme Court found that the federal government had illegally confiscated the property without due process and returned the property to Custis Lee while citing the Court's earlier ruling in the Hunter case. In 1883, the U.S. Congress purchased the property from Lee for its fair market value of $150,000, whereupon the property became a military reservation and eventually Arlington National Cemetery. Although Arlington House is within the National Cemetery, the National Park Service presently administers the House and its grounds as a memorial to Robert E. Lee.

Confederate incursions from Falls Church, Minor's Hill and Upton's Hill—then securely in Confederate hands—occurred as far east as the present-day area of Ballston. On August 17, 1861, an armed force of 600 Confederate soldiers engaged the 23rd New York Infantry near that crossroads, killing one. Another large incursion on August 27 involved between 600 and 800 Confederate soldiers, which clashed with Union soldiers at Ball's Crossroads, Hall's Hill, and along the modern-day border between the City of Falls Church and Arlington. A number of soldiers on both sides were killed. However, the territory in present-day Arlington was never successfully captured by Confederate forces.

Separation from Alexandria

In 1870, the City of Alexandria became legally separated from Alexandria County by an amendment to the Virginia Constitution that made all Virginia incorporated cities (but not incorporated towns) independent of the counties of which they had previously been a part. Because of the confusion between the city and the county having the same name, a movement started to rename Alexandria County. In 1920, the name Arlington County was adopted, after Arlington House, the home of the American Civil War Confederate general Robert E. Lee, which stands on the grounds of what is now Arlington National Cemetery. The Town of Potomac was incorporated as a town in Alexandria County in 1908. The town was annexed by Alexandria in 1930.

In 1896, an electric trolley line was built from Washington through Ballston, which led to growth in the county (see Northern Virginia trolleys).

20th century

In 1920, the Virginia legislature renamed the area Arlington County to avoid confusion with the City of Alexandria which had become an independent city in 1870 under the new Virginia Constitution adopted after the Civil War.

In the 1930s, Hoover Field was established on the present site of the Pentagon; in that decade, Buckingham, Colonial Village, and other apartment communities also opened. World War II brought a boom to the county, but one that could not be met by new construction due to rationing imposed by the war effort.

In October 1942, not a single rental unit was available in the county. On October 1, 1949, the University of Virginia in Charlottesville created an extension center in the county named Northern Virginia University Center of the University of Virginia. This campus was subsequently renamed University College, then the Northern Virginia Branch of the University of Virginia, thereafter, the George Mason College of the University of Virginia, until it was finally designated George Mason University, which it remains today. The Henry G. Shirley Highway (now Interstate 395) was constructed during World War II, along with adjacent developments such as Shirlington, Fairlington, and Parkfairfax.

In February 1959, Arlington County Schools desegregated racially at Stratford Junior High School (now Dorothy Hamm) with the admission of black pupils Donald Deskins, Michael Jones, Lance Newman, and Gloria Thompson. The U.S. Supreme Court's ruling in 1954, Brown v. Board of Education of Topeka, Kansas had struck down the previous ruling on racial segregation Plessy v. Ferguson that held that facilities could be racially "separate but equal". Brown v. Board of Education ruled that "racially separate educational facilities were inherently unequal". The elected Arlington County School Board presumed that the state would defer to localities and in January 1956 announced plans to integrate Arlington schools. The state responded by suspending the county's right to an elected school board. The Arlington County Board, the ruling body for the county, appointed segregationists to the school board and blocked plans for desegregation. Lawyers for the local chapter of the National Association for the Advancement of Colored People (NAACP) filed suit on behalf of a group of parents of both white and black students to end segregation. Black pupils were still denied admission to white schools, but the lawsuit went before the U.S. District Court, which ruled that Arlington schools were to be desegregated by the 1958–59 academic year. In January 1959 both the U.S. District Court and the Virginia Supreme Court had ruled against Virginia's massive resistance movement, which opposed racial integration. The Arlington County Central Library's collections include written materials as well as accounts in its Oral History Project of the desegregation struggle in the county.

Arlington during the 1960s underwent tremendous change after the huge influx of newcomers in the 1950s. M.T. Broyhill & Sons Corporation was at the forefront of building the new communities for these newcomers, which would lead to the election of Joel Broyhill as the representative of Virginia's 10th congressional district for 11 terms. The old commercial districts did not have ample off-street parking and many shoppers were taking their business to new commercial centers, such as Parkington and Seven Corners. Suburbs further out in Virginia and Maryland were expanding, and Arlington's main commercial center in Clarendon was declining, similar to what happened in other downtown centers. With the growth of these other suburbs, some planners and politicians pushed for highway expansion. The Federal Aid Highway Act of 1956 would have enabled that expansion in Arlington. However, he administrator of the National Capital Transportation Agency, economist C. Darwin Stolzenbach, saw the benefits of rapid transit for the region and oversaw plans for a below ground rapid transit system, now the Washington Metro, which included two lines in Arlington. Initial plans called for what became the Orange Line to parallel I-66, which would have mainly benefited Fairfax County. Arlington County officials called for the stations in Arlington to be placed along the decaying commercial corridor between Rosslyn and Ballston that included Clarendon. A new regional transportation planning entity was formed, the Washington Metropolitan Transit Authority. Arlington officials renewed their push for a route that benefited the commercial corridor along Wilson Boulevard, which prevailed. There were neighborhood concerns that there would be high-density development along the corridor that would disrupt the character of old neighborhoods. With the population in the county declining, political leaders saw economic development as a long-range benefit. Citizen input and county planners came up with a workable compromise, with some limits on development. The two lines in Arlington were inaugurated in 1977. The Orange Line's creation was more problematic than the Blue Line's. The Blue Line served the Pentagon and National Airport and boosted the commercial development of Crystal City and Pentagon City. Property values along the Metro lines increased significantly for both residential and commercial property. The ensuing gentrification caused the mostly working and lower middle class white Southern residents to either be priced out of rent or in some cases sell their homes. This permanently changed the character of the city, and ultimately resulted in the virtual eradication of this group over the coming 30 years, being replaced with an increasing presence of a white-collar transplant population mostly of Northern stock. While a population of white-collar government transplant workers had always been present in the county, particularly in its far northern areas and in Lyon Village, the 1980s, 1990s and 2000s saw the complete dominance of this group over the majority of Arlington's residential neighborhoods, and mostly economically eliminated the former working-class residents of areas such as Cherrydale, Lyon Park, Rosslyn, Virginia Square, Claremont, and Arlington Forest, among other neighborhoods. The transformation of Clarendon is particularly striking. This neighborhood, a downtown shopping area, fell into decay. It became home to a vibrant Vietnamese business community in the 1970s and 1980s known as Little Saigon. It has now been significantly gentrified. Its Vietnamese population is now barely visible, except for several holdout businesses. Arlington's careful planning for the Metro has transformed the county and has become a model revitalization for older suburbs.

In 1965, after years of negotiations, Arlington swapped some land in the south end with Alexandria, though less than originally planned. The land was located along King Street and Four Mile Run. The exchange allowed the two jurisdictions to straighten out the boundary and helped highway and sewer projects to go forward. It moved into Arlington several acres of land to the south of the old county line that had not been a part of the District of Columbia.

21st century

On September 11, 2001, five al-Qaeda hijackers deliberately crashed American Airlines Flight 77 into the Pentagon, killing 115 Pentagon employees and 10 contractors in the building, as well as all 53 passengers, six crew members, and five hijackers on board the aircraft.

Arlington, regarded as a model of smart growth, has experienced explosive growth in the early 21st century.

The Turnberry Tower, located in the Rosslyn neighborhood, was completed in 2009.  At the time of completion, the Turnberry Tower was the tallest residential building in the Washington metropolitan area.

In 2017, Nestle USA chose 1812 N Moore in Rosslyn as their US headquarters.

In 2018, Amazon.com, Inc. announced that it would build its co-headquarters in the Crystal City neighborhood, anchoring a broader area of Arlington and Alexandria that was simultaneously rebranded as National Landing.

Geography

Arlington County is located in northeast Virginia and is surrounded by Fairfax County and Falls Church to the west, the city of Alexandria to the southeast, and Washington, D.C., to the northeast directly across the Potomac River, which forms the county's northern border. Other landforms also form county borders, particularly Minor's Hill and Upton's Hill on the west.

It is the smallest county by area in Virginia and is the smallest self-governing county in the United States. About  (17.6%) of the county is federal property. The county courthouse and most government offices are located in the Courthouse neighborhood.

For over 30 years, the government has pursued a development strategy of concentrating much of its new development near transit facilities, such as Metrorail stations and the high-volume bus lines of Columbia Pike.  Within the transit areas, the government has a policy of encouraging mixed-use and pedestrian- and transit-oriented development. Some of these "urban village" communities include:

 Aurora Highlands
 Ballston
 Barcroft
 Bluemont
 Broyhill Heights
 Claremont
 Clarendon
 Courthouse
 Crystal City
 Glencarlyn
 Greenbrier
 High View Park (formerly Halls Hill)
 Lyon Village
 Palisades
 Pentagon City
 Penrose
 Radnor - Fort Myer Heights
 Rosslyn
 Shirlington
 Virginia Square
 Waycroft-Woodlawn (formerly Woodlawn Park)
 Westover
 Williamsburg Circle

In 2002, Arlington received the EPA's National Award for Smart Growth Achievement for "Overall Excellence in Smart Growth." In 2005, the County implemented an affordable housing ordinance that requires most developers to contribute significant affordable housing resources, either in units or through a cash contribution, in order to obtain the highest allowable amounts of increased building density in new development projects, most of which are planned near Metrorail station areas.

A number of the county's residential neighborhoods and larger garden-style apartment complexes are listed in the National Register of Historic Places and/or designated under the County government's zoning ordinance as local historic preservation districts.
These include Arlington Village, Arlington Forest, Ashton Heights, Buckingham, Cherrydale, Claremont, Colonial Village, Fairlington, Lyon Park, Lyon Village, Maywood, Nauck, Penrose, Waverly Hills and Westover. Many of Arlington County's neighborhoods participate in the Arlington County government's Neighborhood Conservation Program (NCP). Each of these neighborhoods has a Neighborhood Conservation Plan that describes the neighborhood's characteristics, history and recommendations for capital improvement projects that the County government funds through the NCP.

Arlington is often spoken of as divided between North Arlington and South Arlington, which designate the sections of the county that lie north and south of Arlington Boulevard. Places in Arlington are often identified by their location in one or the other. Much consideration is given to socioeconomic and demographic differences between these two portions of the county and the respective amounts of attention they receive in the way of public services.

Arlington ranks fourth in the nation, immediately after Washington, D.C., itself, for park access and quality in the 2018 ParkScore ranking of the top 100 park systems across the United States, according to the ranking methodologies of the nonpartisan Trust for Public Land.

Climate
The climate in this area is characterized by hot, humid summers, mild to moderately cold winters, and pleasant spring and fall seasons. Arlington averages 41.82 inches of precipitation that is fairly evenly spread out during the year. Snowfall averages 13.7 inches per year. The snowiest months are January and February, although snow also falls in December and March; scarce snow may fall in November or April. The county usually has 60 nights with lows below freezing and 40 days with highs in the 90s. Hundred degree temperatures readings are rare, even more so negative temperature readings, last occurring August 13, 2016 and January 19, 1994, respectively.   According to the Köppen Climate Classification system, Arlington County has a slightly colder version of the  humid subtropical climate, abbreviated "Cfa" on climate maps.

Demographics

2020 census

Note: the US Census treats Hispanic/Latino as an ethnic category. This table excludes Latinos from the racial categories and assigns them to a separate category. Hispanics/Latinos can be of any race.

2010 census
As of the 2010 census, there were 207,627 people, 98,050 households, and 41,607 families residing in Arlington. The population density was 8,853 people per square mile, the second highest of any county in Virginia.

According to the US Census, the racial makeup of the county in 2012 was 63.8% Non-Hispanic white, 8.9% Non-Hispanic Black or African American, 0.8% Non-Hispanic Native American, 9.9% Non-Hispanic Asian, 0.1% Pacific Islander, 0.29% Non-Hispanic other races, 3.0% Non-Hispanics reporting two or more races. 15.4% of the population was Hispanic or Latino of any race (3.4% Salvadoran, 2.0% Bolivian, 1.7% Mexican, 1.5% Guatemalan, 0.8% Puerto Rican, 0.7% Peruvian, 0.6% Colombian). 28% of Arlington residents were foreign-born as of 2000.

There were 86,352 households, out of which 19.30% had children under the age of 18 living with them, 35.30% were married couples living together, 7.00% had a female householder with no husband present, and 54.50% were non-families. 40.80% of all households were made up of individuals, and 7.30% had someone living alone who was 65 years of age or older. The average household size was 2.15 and the average family size was 2.96.

Families headed by single parents were the lowest in the DC area, under 6%, as estimated by the Census Bureau for the years 2006–2008. For the same years, the percentage of people estimated to be living alone was the third highest in the DC area, at 45%. In 2009, Arlington was highest in the Washington DC Metropolitan area for the percentage of people who were single – 70.9%. 14.3% were married. 14.8% had families. In 2014 Arlington had the 2nd highest concentration of roommates after San Francisco among the 50 largest U.S. cities.

According to a 2007 estimate, the median income for a household in the county was $94,876, and the median income for a family was $127,179. Males had a median income of $51,011 versus $41,552 for females. The per capita income for the county was $37,706. About 5.00% of families and 7.80% of the population were below the poverty line, including 9.10% of those under age 18 and 7.00% of those age 65 or over.

The age distribution was 16.50% under 18, 10.40% from 18 to 24, 42.40% from 25 to 44, 21.30% from 45 to 64, and 9.40% who were 65 or older. The median age was 34 years. For every 100 females, there were 101.50 males. For every 100 females age 18 and over, there were 100.70 males.

CNN Money ranked Arlington as the most educated city in 2006 with 35.7% of residents having held graduate degrees. Along with five other counties in Northern Virginia, Arlington ranked among the twenty American counties with the highest median household income in 2006. In 2009, the county was second in the nation (after nearby Loudoun County) for the percentage of people ages 25–34 earning over $100,000 annually (8.82% of the population).
 In August 2011, CNN Money ranked Arlington seventh in the country in its listing of "Best Places for the Rich and Single."

In 2008, 20.3% of the population did not have medical health insurance. In 2010, AIDS prevalence was 341.5 per 100,000 population. This was eight times the rate of nearby Loudoun County and one-quarter the rate of the District of Columbia.

Crime statistics for 2009 included the report of 2 homicides, 15 forcible rapes, 149 robberies, 145 incidents of or aggravated assault, 319 burglaries, 4,140 incidents of larceny, and 297 reports of vehicle theft. This was a reduction in all categories from the previous year.

According to a 2016 study by Bankrate.com, Arlington is the best place to retire, with nearby Alexandria coming in at second place. Criteria of the study included cost of living, rates of violent and property crimes, walkability, health care quality, state and local tax rates, weather, local culture and well-being for senior citizens.

2021 marked the fourth consecutive year that the American College of Sports Medicine named Arlington the "Fittest City in America" in their annual Fitness Index. Arlington topped the list of 100 cities in both the Personal and the Community & Environment Health metrics.

Government and politics

Local government 

For the last two decades, Arlington has been a Democratic stronghold at nearly all levels of government. However, during a special election in April 2014, a Republican running as an independent, John Vihstadt, captured a County Board seat, defeating Democrat Alan Howze 57% to 41%; he became the first non-Democratic board member in fifteen years. This was in large part a voter response to plans to raise property taxes to fund several large projects, including a streetcar and an aquatics center. County Board Member Libby Garvey, in April 2014, resigned from the Arlington Democratic Committee after supporting Vihstadt's campaign over Howze. Eight months later, in November's general election, Vihstadt won a full term; winning by 56% to 44%. This is the first time since 1983 that a non-Democrat won a County Board general election. In 2018, without the controversial streetcar issue to bolster his campaign, Vihstadt lost.

The county is governed by a five-person County Board; members are elected at-large on staggered four-year terms. They appoint a county manager, who is the chief executive of the County Government.  Like most Virginia counties, Arlington has five elected constitutional officers: a clerk of court, a commissioner of revenue, a commonwealth's attorney, a sheriff, and a treasurer. The budget for the fiscal year 2009 was $1.177 billion.

Incorporation 

Under Virginia law, the only municipalities that may be contained within counties are incorporated towns; incorporated cities are independent of any county. Arlington, despite its population density and largely urban character, is wholly unincorporated with no towns inside its borders. In the 1920s, a group of citizens petitioned the state courts to incorporate the Clarendon neighborhood as a town, but this was rejected; the Supreme Court of Virginia held, in Bennett v. Garrett (1922), that Arlington constituted a "continuous, contiguous, and homogeneous community" that should not be subdivided through incorporation.

Current state law would prohibit the incorporation of any towns within the county because the county's population density exceeds 200 persons per square mile. In 2017, then-county board chairman Jay Fisette suggested that the county as a whole should incorporate as an independent city.

State and federal elections 
In 2009, Republican Attorney General Bob McDonnell won Virginia by a 59% to 41% margin, but Arlington voted 66% to 34% for Democratic State Senator Creigh Deeds. The voter turnout was 42.78%.

Arlington elects four members of the Virginia House of Delegates and two members of the Virginia State Senate. State Senators are elected for four-year terms, while Delegates are elected for two-year terms.

In the Virginia State Senate, Arlington is split between the 30th, 31st, and 32nd districts, represented by Adam Ebbin, Barbara Favola, and Janet Howell, respectively. In the Virginia House of Delegates, Arlington is divided between the 45th, 47th, 48th, and 49th districts, represented by Mark Levine, Patrick Hope, Rip Sullivan, and Alfonso Lopez, respectively.  All are Democrats.

Arlington is part of Virginia's 8th congressional district, represented by Democrat Don Beyer.

The United States Postal Service designates zip codes starting with "222" for exclusive use in Arlington County. However, federal institutions, like Ronald Reagan Washington National Airport and The Pentagon use Washington zip codes.

Economy

Arlington has consistently had the lowest unemployment rate of any jurisdiction in Virginia. The unemployment rate in Arlington was 4.2% in August 2009. 60% of office space in the Rosslyn-Ballston corridor is leased to government agencies and government contractors. There were an estimated 205,300 jobs in the county in 2008. About 28.7% of these were with the federal, state or local government; 19.1% technical and professional; 28.9% accommodation, food and other services.

In October 2008, BusinessWeek ranked Arlington as the safest city in which to weather a recession, with a 49.4% share of jobs in "strong industries". In October 2009, during the economic downturn, the unemployment in the county reached 4.2%. This was the lowest in the state, which averaged 6.6% for the same time period, and among the lowest in the nation, which averaged 9.5% for the same time.

In 2021, there were an estimated 119,447 housing units in the county. In 2010, there were an estimated 90,842 residences in the county. In 2019, the median home was worth $610,000. 4,721 houses, about 10% of all stand-alone homes, were worth $1 million or more. By comparison, in 2000, the median single family home price was $262,400. About 123 homes were worth $1 million or more.

In 2010, 0.9% of the homes were in foreclosure. This was the lowest rate in the DC area.

14% of the nearly 150,000 people working in Arlington live in the county, while 86% commute in, with 27% commuting from Fairfax County. An additional 90,000 people commute out for work, with 42% commuting to DC, and 29% commuting to Fairfax County.

Federal government
A number of federal agencies are headquartered in Arlington, including the Air Force Office of Scientific Research, American Battle Monuments Commission, DARPA, Diplomatic Security Service, Drug Enforcement Administration, Foreign Service Institute, the DHS National Protection and Programs Directorate, Nuclear Waste Technical Review Board, Office of Naval Research, Transportation Security Administration, United States Department of Defense, United States Marshals Service, the United States Trade and Development Agency, and the U.S. AbilityOne Commission.

Companies and organizations

Companies headquartered in Arlington include Amazon (its second headquarters), AES, Alcalde and Fay, Arlington Asset Investment, AvalonBay Communities, CACI, Corporate Executive Board, FBR Capital Markets, Interstate Hotels & Resorts, Pacific Architects and Engineers, Rosetta Stone, and Nestlé USA. Boeing announced on May 5, 2022, that it would be moving its global headquarters to Arlington. On June 7, 2022, Raytheon announced its global headquarters relocation to Arlington.

Organizations located here include the American Institute in Taiwan, Army Emergency Relief, The Conservation Fund, Conservation International, the Consumer Electronics Association, The Fellowship, the Feminist Majority Foundation, the Insurance Institute for Highway Safety, the National Rural Electric Cooperative Association, The Nature Conservancy, the Navy-Marine Corps Relief Society, the Public Broadcasting Service, United Service Organizations, and the US-Taiwan Business Council.

Arlington also has an annex of the South Korean embassy.

Largest employers

According to the county's 2020 Comprehensive Annual Financial Report, the top employers in the county, comprising 27.6% of total county employment are:

Entrepreneurship 
Arlington has been recognized as a strong incubator for start-up businesses, with a number of public/private incubators and resources dedicated to fostering entrepreneurship in the county.

Landmarks

Arlington National Cemetery

Arlington National Cemetery is an American military cemetery established during the American Civil War on the grounds of Confederate General Robert E. Lee's home, Arlington House (also known as the Custis-Lee Mansion). It is directly across the Potomac River from Washington, D.C., north of the Pentagon. With nearly 300,000 graves, Arlington National Cemetery is the second-largest national cemetery in the United States.

Arlington House was named after the Custis family's homestead on Virginia's Eastern Shore. It is associated with the families of Washington, Custis, and Lee. Begun in 1802 and completed in 1817, it was built by George Washington Parke Custis. After his father died, young Custis was raised by his grandmother and her second husband, the first US President George Washington, at Mount Vernon. Custis, a far-sighted agricultural pioneer, painter, playwright, and orator, was interested in perpetuating the memory and principles of George Washington. His house became a "treasury" of Washington heirlooms.

In 1804, Custis married Mary Lee Fitzhugh. Their only child to survive infancy was Mary Anna Randolph Custis, born in 1808. Young Robert E. Lee, whose mother was a cousin of Mrs. Custis, frequently visited Arlington. Two years after graduating from West Point, Lieutenant Lee married Mary Custis at Arlington on June 30, 1831. For 30 years, Arlington House was home to the Lees. They spent much of their married life traveling between U.S. Army duty stations and Arlington, where six of their seven children were born. They shared this home with Mary's parents, the Custis family.

When George Washington Parke Custis died in 1857, he left the Arlington estate to Mrs. Lee for her lifetime and afterward to the Lees' eldest son, George Washington Custis Lee.

The government designated the grounds as a military cemetery on June 15, 1864, by Secretary of War Edwin M. Stanton. In 1882, after many years in the lower courts, the matter of the ownership of Arlington National Cemetery was brought before the United States Supreme Court. The Court decided that the property rightfully belonged to the Lee family. The United States Congress then appropriated the sum of $150,000 for the purchase of the property from the Lee family.

Veterans from all the nation's wars are buried in the cemetery, from the American Revolution through the military actions in Afghanistan and Iraq. Pre-Civil War dead were re-interred after 1900.

The Tomb of the Unknowns, also known as the Tomb of the Unknown Soldier, stands atop a hill overlooking Washington, DC.  President John F. Kennedy is buried in Arlington National Cemetery with his wife Jacqueline Kennedy Onassis and some of their children. His grave is marked with an eternal flame. His brothers, Senators Robert F. Kennedy and Edward M. Kennedy, are also buried nearby. William Howard Taft, who was also a Chief Justice of the U.S. Supreme Court, is the only other President buried at Arlington.

Other frequently visited sites near the cemetery are the U.S. Marine Corps War Memorial, commonly known as the Iwo Jima Memorial, the U.S. Air Force Memorial, the Women in Military Service for America Memorial, the Netherlands Carillon and the U.S. Army's Fort Myer.

The Pentagon

The Pentagon in Arlington is the headquarters of the United States Department of Defense. It was dedicated on January 15, 1943, and it is the world's largest office building. Although it is located in Arlington, the United States Postal Service requires that "Washington, D.C." be used as the place name in mail addressed to the six ZIP codes assigned to The Pentagon.

The building is pentagon-shaped and houses about 23,000 military and civilian employees and about 3,000 non-defense support personnel. It has five floors and each floor has five ring corridors.  The Pentagon's principal law enforcement arm is the United States Pentagon Police, the agency that protects the Pentagon and various other DoD jurisdictions throughout the National Capital Region.

Built during World War II, the Pentagon is the world's largest low-rise office building with 17.5 miles (28.2 km) of corridors, yet it takes only seven minutes to walk between its furthest two points.

Very little steel was used in its design due to the needs of the war effort.

The open-air central plaza in the Pentagon is the world's largest "no-salute, no-cover" area (where U.S. servicemembers need not wear hats nor salute). The snack bar in the center is informally known as the Ground Zero Cafe, a nickname originating during the Cold War when the Pentagon was targeted by Soviet nuclear missiles.

During World War II, the earliest portion of the Henry G. Shirley Memorial Highway was built in Arlington in conjunction with the parking and traffic plan for the Pentagon. This early freeway, opened in 1943 and completed to Woodbridge, Virginia, in 1952, is now part of Interstate 395.

The 9/11 Pentagon Memorial is located outside of the Pentagon and is a major tourist attraction.

Transportation

Streets and roads

Arlington forms part of the region's core transportation network. The county is traversed by two interstate highways, Interstate 66 in the northern part of the county and Interstate 395 in the eastern part, both with high-occupancy vehicle lanes or restrictions. In addition, the county is served by the George Washington Memorial Parkway. In total, Arlington County maintains  of roads.

The street names in Arlington generally follow a unified countywide convention. The north–south streets are generally alphabetical, starting with one-syllable names, then two-, three- and four-syllable names. The first alphabetical street is Ball Street. The last is Arizona. Many east–west streets are numbered. Route 50 divides Arlington County.  Streets are generally labeled North above Route 50, and South below.

Off-road trails travel along the Potomac River or its tributaries, abandoned railroad beds, or major highways, including: Four Mile Run Trail that travels the length of the county; the Custis Trail, which runs the width of the county from Rosslyn; the Washington & Old Dominion Railroad Trail (W&OD Trail) that travels  from the Shirlington neighborhood out to western Loudoun County; the Mount Vernon Trail that runs for  along the Potomac, continuing through Alexandria to Mount Vernon. In Fall 2015, Arlington was awarded a Silver ranking by the League of American Bicyclists for its bike infrastructure.

Public transport

Forty percent of Virginia's transit trips begin or end in Arlington, with the vast majority originating from Washington Metro rail stations.

Arlington is served by the Washington Metropolitan Area Transit Authority (WMATA or Metro), the regional transit agency covering parts of Virginia, Maryland, and the District of Columbia. Arlington has stations on the Orange, Blue, Yellow, and Silver lines of the Washington Metro rail system. Arlington is also served by WMATA's regional Metrobus service. This includes Metroway, the first bus rapid transit (BRT) in the D.C. area, a joint project between WMATA, Arlington County, and Alexandria, with wait times similar to those of Metro trains. Metroway began service in August 2014.

Arlington also operates its own county bus system, Arlington Transit (ART), which supplements Metrobus service with in-county routes and connections to the rail system.

The Virginia Railway Express commuter rail system has one station in Arlington County, at Crystal City. Additionally, public bus services operated by other Northern Virginia jurisdictions include some stops in Arlington, most commonly at the Pentagon. These services include DASH (Alexandria Transit Company), Fairfax Connector, PRTC OmniRide (Potomac and Rappahannock Transportation Commission), and the Loudoun County Commuter Bus.

Other

Capital Bikeshare, a bicycle sharing system, began operations in September 2010 with 14 rental locations primarily around Washington Metro stations throughout the county.

Arlington County is home to Ronald Reagan Washington National Airport, which provides domestic air services to the Washington, D.C., area. In 2009, Condé Nast Traveler readers voted it the country's best airport. Nearby international airports are Washington Dulles International Airport, located in Fairfax and Loudoun counties in Virginia, and Baltimore-Washington International Thurgood Marshall Airport, located in Anne Arundel County, Maryland.

In 2007, the county authorized EnviroCAB, a new taxi company, to operate exclusively with a hybrid-electric fleet of 50 vehicles and also issued permits for existing companies to add 35 hybrid cabs to their fleets. As operations began in 2008, EnvironCab became the first all-hybrid taxicab fleet in the United States, and the company not only offset the emissions generated by its fleet of hybrids, but also the equivalent emissions of 100 non-hybrid taxis in service in the metropolitan area. The green taxi expansion was part of a county campaign known as Fresh AIRE, or Arlington Initiative to Reduce Emissions, that aimed to cut production of greenhouse gases from county buildings and vehicles by 10 percent by 2012. Arlington has a higher than average percentage of households without a car. In 2015, 13.4 percent of Arlington households lacked a car, and dropped slightly to 12.7 percent in 2016. The national average is 8.7 percent in 2016. Arlington averaged 1.40 cars per household in 2016, compared to a national average of 1.8.

Education

Arlington Public Schools operates the county's public K-12 education system of 22 elementary schools; 6 middle schools (Dorothy Hamm Middle School, Gunston Middle School, Kenmore Middle School, Swanson Middle School, Thomas Jefferson Middle School, and Williamsburg Middle School); and 3 public high schools (Wakefield High School, Washington-Liberty High School, and Yorktown High School). H-B Woodlawn and Arlington Tech are alternative public schools. Arlington County spends about half of its local revenues on education. For the FY2013 budget, 83 percent of funding was from local revenues, and 12 percent from the state. Per pupil expenditures are expected to average $18,700, well above its neighbors, Fairfax County ($13,600) and Montgomery County ($14,900).

Arlington has an elected five-person school board whose members are elected to four-year terms. Virginia law does not permit political parties to place school board candidates on the ballot.

Through an agreement with Fairfax County Public Schools approved by the school board in 1999, up to 26 students residing in Arlington per grade level may be enrolled at the Thomas Jefferson High School for Science and Technology in Fairfax at a cost to Arlington of approximately $8,000 per student.  For the first time in 2006, more students (36) were offered admission in the selective high school than allowed by the previously established enrollment cap.

The Roman Catholic Diocese of Arlington helps provide Catholic education in northern Virginia, with early learning centers, elementary and middle schools at the parish level.  Bishop Denis J. O'Connell High School is the diocese's Catholic high school within Arlington County.

Marymount University is the only university with its main campus located in Arlington. Founded in 1950 by the Religious of the Sacred Heart of Mary as Marymount College of Virginia, both its main campus and its Ballston Center are located on North Glebe Road, with a shuttle service connecting the two.

George Mason University operates an Arlington campus in the Virginia Square area between Clarendon and Ballston. The campus houses the Antonin Scalia Law School, School of Policy, Government, and International Affairs and the Jimmy and Rosalynn Carter School for Peace and Conflict Resolution.

In June 2011, Virginia Tech opened the Virginia Tech Research Center - Arlington in Ballston, providing a teaching and research base for graduate students in computer research and engineering to interact with organizations and research agencies in the National Capital area.

Rosslyn is a location for some of the University of Virginia's business programs, including McIntire School of Commerce Master of Science in the Management of Information Technology, and Darden School of Business Master of Business Administration (Executive/Global Executive).

Other private and technical schools maintain a campus in Arlington, including the Institute for the Psychological Sciences, the John Leland Center for Theological Studies, the University of Management and Technology, DeVry University. Strayer University has a campus in Arlington as well as its corporate headquarters.

In addition, Argosy University, Banner College, Everest College, George Washington University, Georgetown University, Northern Virginia Community College, Troy University, the University of New Haven, and the University of Oklahoma all have campuses in Arlington.

Sister cities
Arlington Sister City Association (ASCA) is a nonprofit organization affiliated with Arlington County, Virginia.  ASCA works to enhance and promote the region's international profile and foster productive exchanges in education, commerce, culture and the arts through a series of activities. Established in 1993, ASCA supports and coordinates the activities of Arlington County's five sister cities:

 Aachen, Germany
 Coyoacán (Mexico City), Mexico
 Ivano-Frankivsk, Ukraine
 Reims, France
 San Miguel, El Salvador

Notable people

Notable individuals who were born in and/or have lived in Arlington include The Doors frontman Jim Morrison; former vice president Al Gore; Confederate general Robert E. Lee; U.S. Army general George S. Patton, Jr.; astronaut John Glenn; actors Warren Beatty, Sandra Bullock, and Shirley MacLaine; journalist Katie Couric; musicians Roberta Flack and Zac Hanson; American-Australian footy player Bruce Djite; social commentary YouTuber and activist Natalie Wynn; physician and social activist Patch Adams; Soviet double agent Aldrich Ames; and scientist Grace Hopper.

See also

 Arlington Hall
 Arlington Independent Media
 List of federal agencies in Northern Virginia
 List of neighborhoods in Arlington, Virginia
 List of people from Washington, D.C.
 National Register of Historic Places listings in Arlington County, Virginia
 List of tallest buildings in Arlington, Virginia

Notes

References

External links

Arlington Historical Society
Project DAPS – an online archive of primary sources related to School Desegregation in Arlington.
Why is it Named Arlington? - history of the county's name

 
 

 
Virginia counties
Northern Virginia counties
Virginia counties on the Potomac River
Washington metropolitan area
History of the District of Columbia
1801 establishments in Virginia
Populated places established in 1801